1806 in sports describes the year's events in world sport.

Boxing
Events
 Hen Pearce retains the English championship but no fights involving him are recorded in 1806.

Cricket
Events
 The first two Gentlemen v Players matches take place but the fixture does not occur again until 1819. 
England
 Most runs – William Lambert 276 (HS 64)
 Most wickets – Thomas Howard 21

Horse racing
England
 The Derby – Paris
 The Oaks – Bronze
 St Leger Stakes – Fyldener

References

 
1806